Filadelfo Mugnos (1607 – May 28, 1675) was an Italian historian, genealogist, poet and man of letters.

Biography 
Filadelfo Mugnos was born in Sicily at Lentini in 1607, but moved while young to Palermo. He obtained a doctorate in law at the University of Catania. He was made a member of the Portuguese chivalric Order of Christ and of various learned academies of the day.

Of his numerous historical works, the best known is the Teatro genealogico delle famiglie nobili, titolate, feudatarie ed antiche del fedelissimo regno di Sicilia viventi ed estinte, published in three volumes between 1647 and 1670, which for many centuries has been the mainstay for knowledge about of Sicilian nobility.

Filadelfo Mugnos died in Palermo on 28 May 1675.

Works 
 Il trionfo leontino, o vero, il meraviglioso Martirio o Morte delli gloriosi Martiri Alfio, Filadelfo e Cirino, A. Martarello, Palermo 1640
 Proserpina Rapita, Idillio, Giacobbe Matteo, Messina 1643
 Discorso contro coloro che dicono di essersi ritrovata un'arte nuova di compor Tragedie (inserita nel tomo II delle tragedie di Ortensio Scammacca), Pietro Coppola, Palermo 1645
 Raguagli istorici del Vespro Siciliano, Pietro Coppola, Palermo 1645 (on line ed. 1645) (on line ed. 1669)
 Teatro genologico delle famiglie nobili, titolate, feudatarie ed antiche del fedelissimo regno di Sicilia viventi ed estinte, Pietro Coppola, Palermo 1647 (on line)
 
 Aggitamento accademico sopra l'origine e progresso della lingua latina, Roma 1650
 Annali del Regno di Sicilia con i successi d'anno in anno dal principio della sua abitazione sino all'anno 1649, Palermo 1650
 Historia dell'augustissima famiglia Colonna, Venezia 1658 (on line)
 Il Nuovo Laerzio [...] Parte prima, dove si leggono le Vite de' Filosofi, Poeti, Oratori, Leggisti, Historici, et d'altre famose persone nelle scienze litterali del mondo, e precisamente del nostro Regno di Sicilia, innanzi e dopo Christo Redentore S.N. infino à gli anni del 1600, etcet. In Palermo 1664
 Discorso laconico della famiglia Petrucci, Novello De Bonis,  Napoli 1670
 Albero genealogico delle famiglie Molli, 1674
 Teatro della nobiltà del Mondo, Novello De Bonis, Napoli 1680

Notes

Further reading 
 

1607 births
1675 deaths
People from Lentini
Italian male non-fiction writers
Italian poets
Italian male poets
17th-century Italian poets
17th-century Italian historians
Italian genealogists
Baroque writers